The Chœur d'hommes de Hombourg-Haut is a Men’s chorus in the city Hombourg-Haut (department of Moselle).

Formed in 1865. It is the oldest male voice choir in the historic region of Lorraine.

The choir consists of 65 amateur choristers directed by Norbert Ott. The choir has produced many recordings. Since 1990, it has been organizing annual musical encounters (Rencontres musicales) taking place at the collegiate church of Saint-Stephen in the old Hombourg.

See also 

 Théodore Gouvy
 Théodore Gouvy International Festival

External links 
 "Der König von Thule" Choeur d'hommes de Hombourg-Haut
 Website about the choir
 Les 150 ans du Chœur en 2015 sur TV Mosaïk
 VIAF
 Library of Congress

References 

Boys' and men's choirs
Musical groups established in 1865
French choirs
Organizations based in Grand Est